ThemeAddict: WWE The Music, Vol. 6 is a compilation album released by WWE in 2004. It mostly features recent theme songs of wrestlers on the roster at the time. The album reached a peak of #38 on the Billboard 200 and #2 on the Billboard Top Soundtracks chart.

Track listing
Composed by Jim Johnston (unless noted).
 Evolution – "Line in the Sand" (performed by Motörhead)
 Carlito Caribbean Cool – "Cool"
 Theodore Long – "MacMilitant" (vocals by Miestro)
 Christian – "Just Close Your Eyes" (performed by Waterproof Blonde)
 Heidenreich – "Dangerous Politics"
 WWE Diva Search – "Real Good Girl"
 Chavo Guerrero – "Chavito Ardiente"
 The Undertaker – "The Darkest Side (Remix)"
 Eugene – "Child's Play"
 Victoria – "Don't Mess With" (vocals by The Hood$tars and Nicki Minaj)
 Shelton Benjamin – "Ain't No Stoppin' Me" (vocals by Lucien "Lou$tar" George)
 Billy Kidman – "You Can Run" (vocals by Lorddikim "Boogie" Allah)
 WWE SmackDown – "Rise Up" (performed by Drowning Pool)
 Gail Kim – "International Woman" (performed by Dara Shindler)
 John "Bradshaw" Layfield – "Longhorn"
 John Cena and Tha Trademarc – "Untouchables" (composers: John Cena and Big Daddy Kane)

See also

Music in professional wrestling

Notes

The CD was released with a bonus DVD which featured the songs set to entrance videos. All but Christian's are featured on the DVD since Christian didn't start using the Waterproof Blonde entrance theme "Just Close Your Eyes" until after the album's release. Unlike the version he used for his entrance music, the version on the CD has extended lyrics.
There is a hidden easter egg on the DVD of John Cena promoting his then-upcoming album You Can't See Me.
Undertaker's arena theme is featured on the DVD, but not on the CD.
There are time differences between the tracks on the DVD and the CD. Some tracks on the DVD version are longer than the CD's counterpart, and vice versa.
Randy Orton's theme song "Burn in My Light" was originally on the track list featured on various promotional advertisements in select WWE PPV DVDs. However, it would not be released until 2006, on the album WWE Wreckless Intent.
Nicki Minaj sings the vocals along with The Hood$tars to Victoria's theme song, "Don't Mess With". She is credited as Nicki Maraj.

References

WWE albums
Sports television theme songs
2003 compilation albums
2004 compilation albums
Pop compilation albums
Pop rock compilation albums
Hip hop compilation albums
Dance music compilation albums
Soft rock compilation albums
2003 soundtrack albums
2004 soundtrack albums
Columbia Records compilation albums
Columbia Records soundtracks
Pop soundtracks
Pop rock soundtracks
Hip hop soundtracks
Dance music soundtracks
Soft rock soundtracks